ⱴ (lowercase only) is a letter of the Latin alphabet, used in the phonetic transcription of African languages to represent a labiodental flap. Although not an approved symbol of the International Phonetic Alphabet, it had been widely used to represent this sound. In 2005, the symbol right-hook v, ⱱ, was added to the IPA to represent the sound.

Computer encoding

References

Latin-script letters
Phonetic transcription symbols